The Aviatik C.V was an experimental reconnaissance biplane with a distinctive gull like upper wing. Not to be confused with the DFW C.V which was licence built by Aviatik as the Aviatik C.VI.

C.V
Biplanes